The Drake Hotel, at 216 E. Sixty-sixth Ave. in Gallup, New Mexico, was built in 1919.  It was listed on the National Register of Historic Places in 1988.

It has been described as "Decorative Brick Commercial" in style and has also been known as the Turquoise Club.  It is a two-story blond brick building.

References

		
National Register of Historic Places in McKinley County, New Mexico
Buildings and structures completed in 1919
Hotels in New Mexico